Connerton is an unincorporated community in Schuylkill County, Pennsylvania, United States.

Notable person
Joseph Thomas Daley, Roman Catholic bishop

Notes

Unincorporated communities in Schuylkill County, Pennsylvania
Coal towns in Pennsylvania
Unincorporated communities in Pennsylvania